Hasnain Baqai, also known as Shah Saheb, is an Islamic scholar. He is the patron and parts of various social, academic and other developmental activities of Sufi Sunni Muslims in India.

Family background

He was born on 26 February in Sufi City of Safipur, in highly religious Sufi family of Syed Baqa-Ullah Shah Safvi Khadmi Chishty. He is the son of Maqdoom e Millat Shah Syed Waliullah Baqai.

Positions 
He has held the following positions:

Executive Member of the All India Ulema and Mashaikh Board
National President of Rashtriya Shia Sufi Sangh

Official representative of Member of Parliament Sakshi Maharaj Lok Sabha Unnao.
National General Secretary of Sufi Islamic Board
National General Secretary of All India Sufi Sajjada Nashin Council.

Opinions

Divorce

Baqai disagrees with the notion of a "Triple Talaq" divorce. He is of the view that pronouncing triple Talaq will not render marriage void.
He supported the BJP government rendition of an opinion against the legality of 'triple talaq' divorce for Muslim women, during the proceedings of the Supreme Court.

CAA, NRC

He held a big public meeting with big Shia and Sufi religious leaders of the state along with Bharatiya Janata Party's state president Swatantra Dev Singh regarding CAA, NRC in Uttar Pradesh and supported the government in favor of CAA, NRC.

Execution of Nimr al-Nimr & Faris Zarani

In an interview condemning the execution of Nimr al-Nimr in Saudi Arabia, Baqai said:  "One Shia and [one] Sunni cleric were hanged just because they were raising voices for minorities’ rights and against the sheltering of terrorism by Saudi Arabia."

Terrorism

He speaks vocally against terrorism from forums, he believes that terrorism has no religion.  The youth is being misled in the name of religion and it should be the responsibility of the religious leader of every religion that the person of his religion should not fall under such mischief.

Unity between Shia and Sunni
Baqai advocates the unity of Sunnis and Shia.

Popular Front of India

He started a nation-wide agitation against the Popular Front of India (P.F.I.) He says P.F.I. is a threat to the Peace and Integrity of our Nation and because they are radicalizing the youth of our Nation.

References

Indian Sufis
Living people
1994 births